San Mauro di Saline is a comune (municipality) in the Province of Verona in the Italian region Veneto, located about  west of Venice and about  northeast of Verona. It is part of the Thirteen Communities, a group of villages which historically speak the Cimbrian language.

San Mauro di Saline borders the following municipalities: Badia Calavena, Roverè Veronese, Tregnago, Velo Veronese, and Verona. Sights include the 14th century church of San Leonardo.

References

Cities and towns in Veneto